Zhou Wen (born 1 January 1991) is a former Chinese footballer.

Career statistics

Club

Notes

References

1991 births
Living people
Chinese footballers
Association football forwards
Chinese Super League players
Shenzhen F.C. players